Akram al-Kaabi (born 17 July 1977) is the founder and secretary general of Harakat Hezbollah al-Nujaba (HHN) in Iraq. He is regarded as one of the main operatives of IRGC's Quds Force in Iraq.

Harakat Hezbollah al-Nujaba emerged in 2013 as an offshoot of the Iraqi Shiite militia group Asa'ib Ahl al-Haq.

History

Kaabi started as a commander in the Sadrist Mahdi Army after the 2003 U.S. invasion of Iraq, where he planned and led attacks against Iraqi and U.S.-led Coalition forces with training and funding from Iran's Quds Force. After forming Asa'ib Ahl al-Haq in July 2006, Kaabi became the deputy leader.
In an interview with Long War Journal, Kaabi stated he would overthrow the Iraqi government if ordered by Ayatollah Ali Khamenei. Kaabi formed HHN militia in 2013 in response to the rise of ISIS in Syria, calling for Iraqi Shi'ite militias to travel to Syria and fight on the behalf of the Assad regime.

Sanctions
On 16 September 2008, the U.S. Department of the Treasury designated Akram al-Kaabi as a Specially Designated Global Terrorist (SDGT) "for threatening the peace and stability of Iraq."

On 5 March 2019, the U.S. Department of State designated Kaabi as a Specially Designated Global Terrorist under Executive Order 13224.

Notes

External links

Iraqi insurgency (2003–2011)
Iraqi Shia clerics
Iraqi Shia Muslims
Terrorism in Iraq
Living people
1977 births
Anti-Americanism
Anti-Zionism in Iraq
People of the War in Iraq (2013–2017)
Members of the Popular Mobilization Forces
People of the Iraqi insurgency (2003–2011)
Individuals designated as terrorists by the United States government
People sanctioned under the Magnitsky Act